The 2014–15 Israeli Premier League is the sixteenth season since its introduction in 1999 and the 73nd season of top-tier football in Israel. It began in the end of August 2014 and ended in May 2015. Maccabi Tel Aviv are the defending champions, having won their third Premier League title, and 20th championship last season.

Teams

A total of fourteen teams are competing in the league, including twelve sides from the 2013–14 season and two promoted team from the 2013–14 Liga Leumit.

Hapoel Nir Ramat HaSharon and Bnei Yehuda were relegated to the 2014–15 Liga Leumit after finishing the 2013–14 season in the bottom two places.

Maccabi Netanya and Hapoel Petah Tikva were promoted after finishing the 2013–14 Liga Leumit in the top two places.

Stadia and locations

Personnel and sponsorship

Managerial changes

Regular season

Table

Results

Playoffs
Key numbers for pairing determination (number marks position after 26 games):

Top playoff

Table

Results

Bottom playoff

Table

Results

Season statistics

Top scorers

Source: Israel Football Association

See also
2014–15 Israel State Cup
2014–15 Israel Super Cup
2014–15 Israel Toto Cup

References

Israeli Premier League seasons
1
Isr